Phacusa is a genus of moths in the family Zygaenidae.

Species
 Phacusa birmana Oberthür, 1894
 Phacusa chalcobasis Hampson, 1919
 Phacusa crawfurdi (Moore, 1859)
 Phacusa discoidalis Swinhoe, 1903
 Phacusa dolosa Walker, 1856
 Phacusa inermis Alberti, 1954
 Phacusa khasiana Moore, 1879
 Phacusa manilensis Hampson, 1919
 Phacusa nicobarica Hampson, 1919
 Phacusa paracybele Alberti, 1954
 Phacusa properta Swinhoe, 1890
 Phacusa subtilis Hering, 1925
 Phacusa tenebrosa Walker, 1854
 Phacusa tonkinensis Alberti, 1954

References

Natural History Museum Lepidoptera generic names catalog

Procridinae